Ma Jun (born 6 March 1989) is a female Chinese footballer who plays as a midfielder for Wuhan Jianghan University.

International goals

External links 
 

1989 births
Living people
Chinese women's footballers
China women's international footballers
2015 FIFA Women's World Cup players
Footballers from Jiangsu
People from Lianyungang
Women's association football midfielders
Footballers at the 2010 Asian Games
Footballers at the 2014 Asian Games
Chinese expatriate sportspeople in South Korea
Asian Games competitors for China